Teepookana was a short lived port, community and railway stopping place on the southern bank of the King River, in Western Tasmania.

Port and railway station
It was important as a port during the construction of the railway between Regatta Point and Teepookana in the late nineteenth century.  It was located between the two railway bridges that cross the King River.

Following the completion of the railway the community diminished in size and importance, however it is still listed in railway information for the West Coast Wilderness Railway.

Station sequence
 Queenstown (Tasmania) railway station
 Lynchford
 Rinadeena
 Dubbil Barril
 Teepookana
 Regatta Point

Teepookana Plateau
Teepookana Plateau, Tasmania is high ground adjacent to the King River, the site of forest reserves and forested areas to the west of the West Coast Range and Mount Jukes in the  West Coast of Tasmania.

It is within a few kilometres south of the location and railway line.

References

West Coast Wilderness Railway
Railway stations in Western Tasmania